George Henry Blocksidge (20 September 1855 – 20 January 1944) was a member of the Queensland Legislative Assembly.

Biography
Blocksidge was born at Brisbane, Queensland, the son of the William Blocksidge and his wife Esther (née Shelly). He was educated at Brisbane State Schools and became a real estate agent.

On 3 November 1880 he married Kate Georgina Bell (died 1943) at Ipswich and together had two sons and five daughters, one of which was the well-known poet William Baylebridge. He died in January 1944 and his funeral proceeded from Quambathella, his East Brisbane residence to the Balmoral Cemetery.

Public life
Blocksidge was mayor of South Brisbane in 1903 before winning  the seat of Woolloongabba for the Opposition Party at the 1907 Queensland state election, defeating the sitting member Thomas Dibley. He held the seat until the special state election held the following year when he was beaten by the Ministerial candidate, David Hunter.

References

Members of the Queensland Legislative Assembly
1855 births
1944 deaths
Burials in Balmoral Cemetery, Brisbane
Politicians from Brisbane